Aclytia is a genus of tiger moths in the family Erebidae. The genus was erected by Jacob Hübner in 1819.

Species
 Aclytia albistriga Schaus, 1910
 Aclytia apicalis Walker, 1854
 Aclytia bractea Moschler, 1877
 Aclytia coerulonitans Rothschild, 1912
 Aclytia conjecturalis Draudt, 1930
 Aclytia flavicaput Rothschild, 1912
 Aclytia flavigutta Walker, 1854
 Aclytia gynamorpha Hampson, 1898
 Aclytia heber Cramer, 1872
 Aclytia hoffmannsi Rothschild, 1912
 Aclytia jonesi Rothschild, 1912
 Aclytia klagesi Rothschild, 1912
 Aclytia leucaspila Fleming, 1959
 Aclytia mariamne Druce, 1855
 Aclytia mictochroa Hampson, 1914
 Aclytia modesta Kohler, 1924
 Aclytia petraea Schaus, 1892
 Aclytia punctata Butler, 1876
 Aclytia pydna Druce, 1899
 Aclytia reducta Rothschild, 1912
 Aclytia signatura Walker, 1854
 Aclytia superbior Strand
 Aclytia terra Schaus, 1896
 Aclytia ventralis Guérin-Méneville, 1843

References

 
Euchromiina
Moth genera